The 2001 Women's Lacrosse World Cup was the sixth Women's Lacrosse World Cup and was played in High Wycombe, England from July 7–14, 2001. The United States defeated Australia in the final to win the tournament.

Results

Group A

Table

Group B

Table

Quarter-finals (Jul 11)
Canada v Wales 7-5
United States v Germany 18-0
Australia v Scotland 19-4
England v Japan 5-3

Semi-finals (Jul 12)
Australia v England 8-2
United States v Canada 25-2

Seventh Place (Jul 13)
Japan v Germany 11-3

Fifth Place (Jul 13)
Wales v Scotland 5-2

Third Place (Jul 14)
England v Canada 9-4

Final (Jul 14)
United States v Australia 14-8

References

2001
Women's Lacrosse World Cup
2001
Lacrosse World Cup